Stratford Girls' Grammar School (formerly Stratford-upon-Avon Grammar School for Girls) is a fully selective girls' grammar school in England situated in Stratford-upon-Avon.

Admissions
The school has been consistently recognised as one of the top twenty state schools in England, became a Specialist Language College in 2002, and was later awarded the status of a Specialist Science College. Since 2011 the school has been awarded status as an academy school. Entry is by examination at 11, although entry may be made in later years or most commonly at sixth form level.

History
The school opened in 1958. Before this time, academically able girls in Stratford had no hope of an education beyond comprehensive level, unless their parents could afford to send them to the King's High School For Girls in nearby Warwick. The Hugh Clopton School for Girls was given a Grammar Stream as the result of the 1944 Education Act. It was one of only two bilateral Schools in Warwickshire. The first and second intakes took the External School Certificate and after that when O and A Levels came into force, these were taken as a matter of course. Thanks to the sustained efforts of several women, including the first Headmistress Miss E.B. Williams, (Miss Williams was appointed Head of the bi-lateral school) the first pupils were taken from the A stream of nearby Hugh Clopton School, known today as Stratford-upon-Avon School. In August 2011 the school changed to Academy (Mainstream Converter) status and changed its official name from Stratford-upon-Avon Grammar School for Girls to Stratford Girls' Grammar School. The name Shottery, as the school is often known, came later when there were too many pupils to be accommodated in the old building. , the school admits around 120 new Year 7 pupils per year. Competition for places is high, with more than seven applicants per place.

The original school was centred on the historic Shottery Manor, parts of which date from the 14th century. The Manor still stands today, and is used as a sixth form centre. Three additional buildings were added before the school opened, in what were originally the Manor orchards and flower gardens. The Garrett Teaching block was expanded in work that was completed in 2013.

Notable former pupils

 Captain Helen Allkins, Matron-in-Chief of the Queen Alexandra's Royal Naval Nursing Service, and Director of Naval Nursing Services since July 2008.
 Corrie Corfield, Radio 4 continuity announcer and news reader.
 Karen Dotrice, actress.
 Miranda Merron, offshore sailor.

References

External links
 EduBase

Grammar schools in Warwickshire
Girls' schools in Warwickshire
Educational institutions established in 1958
1958 establishments in England
Buildings and structures in Stratford-upon-Avon
Academies in Warwickshire